Wytheville is a town in, and the county seat of, Wythe County, in southwestern Virginia, United States. It is named after George Wythe, a signer of the United States Declaration of Independence, and mentor to Thomas Jefferson. Wytheville's population was 8,211 at the 2010 census.  Interstate Highways 77 and 81 were constructed to intersect at the town, long a crossroads for travelers.

During the American Civil War, Wytheville had a strategic importance. It was attacked in 1863 (Toland's Raid) and 1865 (Stoneman's 1865 Raid).  The town is the birthplace of Edith Bolling Wilson, second wife of President Woodrow Wilson.

History

Wythe County was created in 1789 and named for George Wythe, the "father of American Jurisprudence" and signer of the Declaration of Independence. In May 1790, Chris Simmerman donated 90 acres, along with John Davis's 10 acres, to establish a town and county seat. Robert Adams completed a town survey in November of that year, dividing the area into half-acre lots. The town did not have an official name yet, but was generally known as Wythe Court House.

Two years later, in October 1792, the town was officially named Evansham, for prominent local citizen Jesse Evans. After a disastrous fire in March 1839, the town was renamed Wytheville. At that time, it was home to about 500 residents.

Lynching of Raymond Bird

In 1926 the last documented lynching in Virginia took place here, when Raymond Bird, an African-American man, was murdered by a large group of masked and costumed men while under arrest in the local jail.  Bird was accused of raping or assaulting the three white daughters of Grover Grubb, his employer.  The two older sisters, both of which bore Bird's children, were of age and revealed that the relationship was consensual and thus did not constitute a crime. However, he was eventually arrested on the accusation that he assaulted the minor daughter.  Bird was shot and killed by the mob in his jail cell, dragged a few miles behind a truck, then put his body in the boot of a car, and then his dead body hanged from a tree on Charley Brown's land hear St. Paul Lutheran Church.  The event provoked outrage and national coverage by newspapers.

Bird's death was a catalyst for Virginia's passing an anti-lynching law in 1928, largely because of a campaign led by Louis I. Jaffé, editor of the Norfolk Virginian-Pilot. It was supported by Governor Harry Flood Byrd Sr., who linked the bill to his efforts to attract new businesses to the state.

Polio epidemic
A few cases of polio during the summer of 1950 swelled into an epidemic of hundreds. It was known to cause infantile and even adult paralysis. Of the 5,513 inhabitants of the town, 184 people contracted the disease, resulting in 17 fatalities. From the beginning of June until the end of August, parents kept children inside, and large gatherings were cancelled to diminish the chance of infection.

Hearses from local funeral homes were used when ambulances were unavailable.

The Town Council erected billboards at all five entrances to the county, warning potential visitors of the epidemic and urging tourists to return the following year. By the end of the summer, all five billboards were stolen or demolished. Though the Town Council offered a reward for information, no one came forward.

Historic sites
The Crockett's Cove Presbyterian Church, Haller-Gibboney Rock House, Loretto, St. John's Episcopal Church, St. John's Lutheran Church and Cemetery, Wythe County Poorhouse Farm, and Wytheville Historic District are listed on the National Register of Historic Places.

Geography
Wytheville is located at  (36.947679, −81.086955).

Wytheville is an important point on both I-77 and I-81 and lies amidst a wrong-way concurrency of I-77 and I-81. It is located about halfway between Bristol, Tennessee/Virginia and Roanoke. On the I-77 corridor, it is located about halfway between Charleston, West Virginia and Charlotte, North Carolina. The nearby community of Fort Chiswell is the control city for the northbound traffic on I-77 coming from Charlotte, Statesville, Elkin, and Mount Airy, North Carolina. In the near future, Interstate 74 will go through Wytheville in addition to the two other interstates.

Due to the confluence of I-77, I-81 and several U.S. Highways, and its location in the foothills of the Blue Ridge Mountains, Wytheville is known as "The Hub of Southwest Virginia" and "The Crossroads of the Blue Ridge".

Climate 
Due to its elevation, the climate of Wytheville is either classified as mountain temperate or humid subtropical (Köppen Cfb or Cfa, respectively), and the town straddles the border between USDA Plant Hardiness Zones 6B and 7A. Summers are warm and humid, although significantly cooler than low-elevation places within the state, with only 4.6 days of + highs annually, and winters are generally cool to cold with occasional intervening warm periods and 11 nights of sub- lows.

Demographics

As of the census of 2000, there were 7,804 people, 3,504 households, and 2,112 families residing in the town. The population density was 546.8 people per square mile (211.2/km2). There were 3,776 housing units at an average density of 264.6 per square mile (102.2/km2). The racial makeup of the town was 90.76% White, 7.19% African American, 0.13% Native American, 0.70% Asian, 0.03% Pacific Islander, 0.33% from other races, and 0.86% from two or more races. Hispanic or Latino of any race were 0.82% of the population.

There were 3,504 households, out of which 22.9% had children under the age of 18 living with them, 43.4% were married couples living together, 13.6% had a female householder with no husband present, and 39.7% were non-families. 36.2% of all households were made up of individuals, and 16.3% had someone living alone who was 65 years of age or older. The average household size was 2.11 and the average family size was 2.72.

In the town, the population was spread out, with 19.3% under the age of 18, 6.9% from 18 to 24, 25.3% from 25 to 44, 25.6% from 45 to 64, and 22.8% who were 65 years of age or older. The median age was 44 years. For every 100 females, there were 78.1 males. For every 100 females age 18 and over, there were 75.2 males.

The median income for a household in the town was $28,043, and the median income for a family was $41,513. Males had a median income of $28,160 versus $21,282 for females. The per capita income for the town was $20,223. About 10.0% of families and 14.6% of the population were below the poverty line, including 21.5% of those under age 18 and 9.6% of those age 65 or over.

Media
WYVE 1280 on the AM dial signed-on in 1949. In August 2018, WYVE acquired FM Translator dial position 99.9FM. Three Rivers Media Corp. owns WYVE and its sister stations, WXBX and WLOY with towers in Wythe County and studio space adjacent to Downtown Wytheville.

Places of interest

 The Edith Bolling Wilson Birthplace 
 Big Walker Lookout Tower, a 100-foot observation tower located 12 miles to the north of Wytheville 
The town is home to a Chautauqua Festival, held the third weekend in June every year since 1985. The Festival features live concerts, stage magic, arts and crafts, hot air ballooning, dance, children's activities and diverse carnival-style food. The presence of the hot air balloons for the yearly festival inspired the balloon-themed painting of the town's water tower, visible to I-81 travellers near the I-77 interchange.  The Festival is held at Elizabeth Brown Memorial Park and is cosponsored by the county, town and the Wythe Arts Council.

Notable people
 David French Boyd, president of Louisiana State University, 1877–1880; 1884–1886, born in Wytheville in 1834
 Thomas Duckett Boyd, president of LSU from 1886 (interim) and 1896 to 1926, born in Wytheville in 1854, brother of David French Boyd
 William Gibson, writer, spent much of his childhood there
 William Nauns Ricks, poet   
 E. Lee Trinkle, Governor of Virginia
 James Walker, Lt. Governor of Virginia; Confederate General
 Edith Bolling Wilson, second wife of President Woodrow Wilson
 Robert E. Withers, former U.S. Senator, Lt. Governor of Virginia, first American Ambassador to China

References

Further reading

External links

 Visit Wytheville (Visitor's guide, history, and other resources)

21st-century Chautauquas
Towns in Wythe County, Virginia
Towns in Virginia
County seats in Virginia
U.S. Route 11
Southwest Virginia